Obara Dam is a gravity dam located in Shimane Prefecture in Japan. The dam is used for flood control and water supply. The catchment area of the dam is 289 km2. The dam impounds about 230  ha of land when full and can store 60800 thousand cubic meters of water. The construction of the dam was started on 1987 and completed in 2010.

References

Dams in Shimane Prefecture
2010 establishments in Japan